John Ferris (January 9, 1811 – 1884) was a New Brunswick businessman, explorer and political figure. He represented Queen's in the House of Commons of Canada as a Liberal member from 1867 to 1878. His surname also appears as Farris in some sources, such as the 1881 census.

He was born in Cambridge, Queen's County, New Brunswick in early 1811, the son of John Ferris. Ferris was a lumber merchant and farmer. He represented Queen's County in the Legislative Assembly of New Brunswick from 1844 to 1864 and from 1866 to 1867. Ferris died in Cambridge at the age of 72.

References 

1811 births
1884 deaths
Liberal Party of Canada MPs
Members of the House of Commons of Canada from New Brunswick
New Brunswick Liberal Association MLAs